Paul Chomat (9 January 1938 – 5 May 2021) was a French politician. A member of the French Communist Party, he served on the National Assembly from 1981 to 1988.

References

1938 births
2021 deaths
Politicians from Saint-Étienne
Deputies of the 7th National Assembly of the French Fifth Republic
Deputies of the 8th National Assembly of the French Fifth Republic
French general councillors
French Communist Party politicians